The Keystone State-class crane ships are seven auxiliary crane ships of the U.S. Maritime Administration Ready Reserve Force.  The  ships can be quickly activated to support military sea transportation needs. These self-sustaining ships are useful in ports that have limited, damaged or undeveloped port facilities. When activated, they come under operational control of Military Sealift Command.

Description 
The crane ships are converted container ships with three twin boom pedestal cranes which can lift containers or other cargo from themselves or adjacent vessels and deposit the cargo on a pier or lighterage.

History 
The US Navy converted ten cargo ships to crane ships, three Gopher State class and seven Keystone State class, the first of which was completed in 1984 and the last of which was completed in 1997. Five of the ships were deployed to the Persian Gulf in 1990–91.  acted as a temporary Army prepositioning ship in 1994. Four of the ten ships have been deactivated and transferred to the reserve fleet.

General characteristics
Builder: Defoe SB Co, Bay City; Dillingham SR, Portland; Norshipco, Norfolk; Tampa SY; Keith Ship Repair, New Orleans
Propulsion: 2 boilers; 2 GE turbines; 19,250 hp; 1 shaft.
Length: 668.6 feet.
Beam: 76.1 feet
Displacement: 31,500 tons(32,005.52 metric tons) full load.
Speed: 20 knots
Crew: 89 civilians
Load: 300+ standard containers

List of ships

References

 Property Management and Archive Record System

External links
 United States Navy Fact File

 
Auxiliary transport ship classes